Sancho II (8 September 1209 – 4 January 1248), nicknamed the Cowled or the Capuched, alternatively, the Pious, was King of Portugal from 1223 to 1248. He was succeeded on the Portuguese throne by his brother, King Afonso III, in 1248.

Sancho was born in Coimbra, the eldest son of Afonso II of Portugal by his wife, Urraca of Castile.

Military career and reign
By the time of his accession to the throne, in 1223, Portugal was embroiled in a difficult diplomatic conflict with the Catholic Church. His father, Afonso II, had been excommunicated by Pope Honorius III, for his attempts at reducing the Church's power within the country. A treaty of 10 articles was signed between the Pope and Sancho II, but the king paid little attention to its fulfillment. His priority was the Reconquista, the reconquest of the southern Iberian Peninsula from the Moors. From 1236 onwards, Sancho II conquered several cities in the Algarve and Alentejo, securing the Portuguese position in the region.

Dispossession from throne
Sancho II proved a capable commander but, with regard to equally important administrative issues, he was less competent. With his total attention focused on military campaigns, the ground was open for internal disputes. The nobility was displeased by the king's conduct and started to conspire against him. Moreover, the middle class of merchants quarrelled frequently with the clergy, without any intervention from the king. As a result, the bishop of Porto made a formal complaint to the pope about this state of affairs. Since the Church was the dominant power of the 13th century, Pope Innocent IV felt free to issue bull Grandi non immerito, ordering the Portuguese to choose a new king to replace the so-called heretic.

In 1246, recalcitrant nobles invited Sancho's brother Afonso, Count of Boulogne, to take the throne. Afonso immediately abdicated from his French possessions and marched into Portugal.

Exile and death
After a civil war lasting from late 1245 to mid 1247 and a Castilian intervention by the Castilian heir, Prince Alfonso, he fled in exile to Toledo, Spain when Alfonso retreated his forces to support his father in the siege of Seville. He died in the former city on 4 January 1248 and was buried in its cathedral.

Marriage
Sancho married, circa 1240, a Castilian lady, Mécia Lopes de Haro, widow of Alvaro Peres de Castro, and daughter of Lope Díaz II de Haro and Urraca Alfonso de León, an illegitimate daughter of Alfonso IX of León, but they had no legitimate sons.

References

Portuguese infantes
House of Burgundy-Portugal
Medieval child monarchs
1209 births
1248 deaths
People of the Reconquista
People from Coimbra
13th-century Portuguese monarchs